Flubromazolam (JYI-73)  is a triazolobenzodiazepine (TBZD), which are benzodiazepine (BZD) derivatives. Flubromazolam is reputed to be highly potent, and concerns have been raised that clonazolam and flubromazolam in particular may pose comparatively higher risks than other designer benzodiazepines, due to their ability to produce strong sedation and amnesia at oral doses of as little as 0.5 mg. Life-threatening adverse reactions have been observed at doses of only 3 mg of flubromazolam.

Legal status

Sweden 
Flubromazolam has been classified as an illegal substance in Sweden after seizures by customs and police, as well as indications from the EMCDDA of wider use as a recreational drug.

Switzerland 
Flubromazolam is illegal in Switzerland as of December 2015.

United Kingdom 
In the UK, flubromazolam has been classified as a Class C drug by the May 2017 amendment to The Misuse of Drugs Act 1971 along with several other designer benzodiazepine drugs.

Australia 
In Australia, flubromazolam is Schedule 9 under federal law.

United States

Flubromazolam is controlled in Virginia. The Drug Enforcement Administration had announced, in December 2022, of their intent to place the substance under control in Schedule I.

See also 

 3-Hydroxyphenazepam
 Adinazolam
 Bromazolam
 Desmethyletizolam
 Desmethylflunitrazepam
 Diclazepam
 Etizolam
 Flualprazolam
 Flubrotizolam
 Meclonazepam
 Nifoxipam
 Phenazepam
 Pyrazolam

References 

Bromoarenes
Fluoroarenes
GABAA receptor positive allosteric modulators
Triazolobenzodiazepines